The dwarf rocket frog (Litoria dorsalis) is a species of frog in the subfamily Pelodryadinae.

It is found in New Guinea and its natural habitats are subtropical or tropical dry forests, subtropical or tropical moist lowland forests, moist savanna, intermittent freshwater marshes, rural gardens, and heavily degraded former forests.

References

Litoria
Amphibians of Papua New Guinea
Amphibians described in 1877
Taxonomy articles created by Polbot
Frogs of Australia